The second series of Glow Up: Britain's Next Make-Up Star began on 14 May 2020 on BBC Three, and concluded on 2 July 2020. The series was hosted by Stacey Dooley, and was judged by industry professionals Dominic Skinner and Val Garland. Various guest stars including Henry Holland and Michelle Visage appeared. The series was won by Ophelia Liu, with James Mac Inerney finishing as runner-up.

Contestants

Contestant progress

  The contestant won Glow Up.
 The contestant was a runner-up.
 The contestant came in third place.
 The contestant won the challenge.  
 The contestant was originally in the red chair but later declared safe.
 The contestant was originally safe but later up for elimination.
 The contestant was in the red chair and still eligible for elimination.
 The contestant was originally safe but later up for elimination and was then further eliminated.
 The contestant won the challenge but was up for elimination, but not eliminated.
 The contestant won the challenge but was eliminated. 
 The contestant decided to leave the competition before the face-off.
 The contestant was in the red chair and then further eliminated.

Face offs

 The contestant was eliminated after their first time in the face off.
 The contestant was eliminated after their second time in the face off.
 The contestant was eliminated after their third time in the face off.
 The contestant won the final face off and became Britain’s Next Make Up Star.

Guest judges

 Min Sandhu (Episode 1)
 Henry Holland (Episode 2)
 Ashley Roller (Episode 3)
 Michelle Visage (Episode 4)
 Andrew Gallimore (Episode 4)
 Megan Thomas (Episode 5)
 Lisa Armstrong (Episode 6)
 Rankin (Episode 7)
 Annalise Fard (Episode 8)
 Anastasia Soare (Episode 8)

Special guests
Mario Dedivanovic

Episodes

References

2020 British television seasons